"Love" (stylized as "LOVE.") is a song by American rapper Kendrick Lamar, from his fourth studio album Damn, released on April 14, 2017. The tenth track on the album (fifth on the Collector's Edition of Damn), the song was written by Lamar, Zacari Pacaldo, Teddy Walton, Sounwave, Greg Kurstin, and Anthony Tiffith, and produced by the latter four. The song features soul singer Zacari, who is one of three credited musicians on Damn, the others being Barbadian singer Rihanna on "Loyalty", and Irish rock band U2 on "XXX." The song was later sent to rhythmic radio as the album's third single October 2, 2017.

Described by Zacari as "a whole new genre", the song is a love song where Lamar describes his devotion to his fiancée, Whitney Alford.

Lyrics 
According to fan speculation, the song's lyrics describe Lamar's love and devotion to his fiancée and future mother of his children, Whitney Alford. Specifically, Lamar describes the intense passion he has of becoming one with someone else, not just his feelings of sexual desire and affection to her. This is at least one possible interpretation, as Kendrick Lamar has not spoken on the meaning of the lyrics.

Composition 
The song has a tempo of 126 BPM and is in the key of F major.

Critical reception 
Clover Hope of The Muse said the song was "one of the best songs on DAMN." A positive review from Christopher Hooton of The Independent described singer Zacari's hook as very catchy and the production from Greg Kurstin (known for Sia's "Chandelier" and Adele's "Hello") as "on point", but tonally described the song as feeling at odds with the rest of the album.

Commercial performance
Prior to its release as a single, "Love" debuted at number 18 on the Billboard Hot 100 the week of the album release. After the song was released as a single, it re-entered the charts at number 41 for the week ending December 2, 2017 and moved up to 27 the next week. It has peaked at number 11. "Love" spent 40 weeks on the Billboard Hot 100 before dropping out on its 41st week on April 14, 2018.

Music video
The music video for the song was released to Lamar's Vevo channel on YouTube on December 21, 2017. It was directed by Dave Meyers and The Little Homies. It features a cameo from Travis Scott, sitting on the staircase that Kendrick is rapping in front of, who previously collaborated with Lamar on 2016's "Goosebumps" from Scott's sophomore album, Birds in the Trap Sing McKnight, and in 2018's Big Shot, from Black Panther - The Album. Zacari is featured in the music video as the driver of the convertible that Kendrick is riding in the front passenger seat of, while rapping. During the shoot in a scene in the video, Kendrick hinted an easter egg for his then upcoming involvement for Black Panther: The Album through the director clip shown.

Live performances 
Lamar performed "Love" for the first time as an encore at the Coachella Valley Music and Arts Festival on April 23, 2017. Lamar has performed "Love" on the Damn tour.

Covers 
Scottish band Chvrches covered the song on Like a Version in July 2018.

Credits and personnel 
Credits adapted from the official Damn digital booklet.
Kendrick Duckworth – songwriter
Zacari Pacaldo – songwriter
Teddy Walton – songwriter, producer
Mark Spears – songwriter, producer
Greg Kurstin – songwriter, producer
Anthony Tiffith – songwriter, producer
Kid Capri – additional vocals
Derek Ali – mixing
Tyler Page – mix assistant
Cyrus Taghipour – mix assistant, mixing
Zeke Mishanec  – additional recording
Brendan Silas Perry – additional recording

Charts

Weekly charts

Year-end charts

Certifications

Release history

References

2017 songs
2017 singles
Kendrick Lamar songs
Songs written by Kendrick Lamar
Songs written by Greg Kurstin
Songs written by Sounwave
Songs written by Teddy Walton
Music videos directed by Dave Meyers (director)
Song recordings produced by Greg Kurstin
Contemporary R&B songs
Trap music songs